The Integration Bee is an annual integral calculus competition pioneered in 1981 by Andy Bernoff, an applied mathematics student at the Massachusetts Institute of Technology (MIT). Similar contests are administered each year in many universities and colleges across the United States and in a number of other countries.

Rules and conventions 
Prospective participants may first need to take a qualifying exam. The contest is then arranged in a manner similar to a sports tournament, with those who incorrectly evaluate integrals after a certain number of trials are eliminated. Constants of integration may be ignored, but the final answer must be in reduced form and in terms of the original variable. At some institutions, such as MIT, contestants will evaluate assigned integrals on a chalkboard in front of the audience. In some others, such as the University of Connecticut, they may do so in their seats on paper. Contestants may either be all students from the hosting institution (such as MIT or the University of California, Berkeley), undergraduates only (such as at the University of Connecticut), or undergraduates and high-school students (such as at the University of North Texas).

Participants are expected to be familiar with the standard methods of integration.

Prizes are in cash, vouchers, and/or books.

U.S. competitions 

Integration Bee contests continue to be held at MIT, with the champion awarded a hat carrying the title, "Grand Integrator."

Integration Bee contests are now regularly conducted in major American universities, including the University of Florida, Florida Polytechnic University, the University of Scranton, Connecticut College, Central Connecticut State University, Columbia University, the State University of New York, the University of Wisconsin–Madison, Prairie State College (Illinois), the University of Illinois at Urbana–Champaign, University of Dayton (Ohio), Louisiana Tech University, the University of North Texas, Brigham Young University, Utah Valley University, Fresno State University, Cosumnes River College, the University of California, Berkeley, various other institutions in California, and Oregon State University.

The Louisiana/Mississippi chapter of the Mathematical Association of America is responsible for holding the Integration Bee in these two states and the American Mathematical Society at the University of Connecticut.

Non-U.S. competitions
A Philippine integration competition (often shortened as Integ Bee) was originally held four times at the University of the Philippines Diliman, located in Quezon City, and sponsored by UP Physics Association (UPPA). Subsequently, the competition was scaled up to allow undergraduates of other Philippine universities to participate. One typical event in 2014 at the Philippine National Institute of Physics, allowed contestants to test their accuracy and speed, capability in mental solving, and mastery in evaluating integrals. The winner received a cash prize of 5,000 Philippine pesos (about €100 or US$113), whilst two runners-up received 1,000 pesos (about €20 or US$22).

The Integration Bee is also held at the University of Cambridge, University of New South Wales, Australia, and Indian Institute of Science Education and Research, Pune. The Bee held at Cambridge has participants from other British universities, including University of Oxford, Imperial College London, Durham University and University of Warwick.

Impact 
While integral calculus is no longer an actively researched topic in mathematics, there is some correlation between success in the integration bee and success in other areas of mathematics. On a more individual level the winners of the integration bee are held in high honor by their colleagues and professors alike.

See also 

 List of mathematics competitions
 Math circle
 Mathematics education in the United States
 William Lowell Putnam Mathematical Competition

References

External links
 Integration Bee website
 Facebook page of the Integration Bee
 On-line portal, UP Physics Association
 Twitter account, UP Physics Association

Mathematics competitions
Student culture in the United States
Awards by university and college in the United States
Mathematical games
University of the Philippines Diliman
Massachusetts Institute of Technology